CUSG may refer to:

 Canadian University Science Games
 Confederación de Unidad Sindical de Guatemala
 University of Colorado Student Government